Raymond Wodehouse Fox (11 July 1873 – 21 August 1948) was a British Army officer and cricketer. He played first-class cricket for Oxford University from 1896 to 1898, for Sussex from 1896 to 1900, and occasional matches thereafter.

Biography
Fox was born in Gloucestershire, and educated at Wellington College, Berkshire, and Hertford College, Oxford. In all he appeared in 27 first-class matches as a right-handed batsman and wicketkeeper. He scored 106 runs with a highest score of 20 and completed 39 catches with 13 stumpings.

He joined the army as a second lieutenant in 1900 and served in the Boer War. He was promoted to Lieutenant on 8 January 1902, and joined the Royal Warwickshire Regiment in March the same year.

He died in Sussex in 1948.

References

External links

1873 births
1948 deaths
English cricketers
Sussex cricketers
Oxford University cricketers
Marylebone Cricket Club cricketers
People educated at Wellington College, Berkshire
Alumni of Hertford College, Oxford
Royal Warwickshire Fusiliers officers
People from South Gloucestershire District
H. D. G. Leveson Gower's XI cricketers
A. J. Webbe's XI cricketers
People from Ticehurst
British military personnel of the Second Boer War
20th-century British Army personnel